"Yes or No" is a song by American rock band the Go-Go's, from their 1984 album Talk Show. The song was co-written by the Go-Go's guitarist Jane Wiedlin, Ron and Russell Mael of the Los Angeles band Sparks.

Wiedlin and Sparks also recorded together in 1983, with Wiedlin providing vocals for two tracks on Sparks' album In Outer Space; album track "Lucky Me, Lucky You" and the band's highest charting U.S. single "Cool Places".

Track listing
 7" single (I.R.S. Records – BR-9933)
 "Yes Or No" (Remix) (Wiedlin, Mael, Mael) – 3:36
 "Mercenary" (Wiedlin, Valentine, Caffey) – 3:40

Chart positions

References

1984 singles
The Go-Go's songs
Songs written by Jane Wiedlin
Songs written by Ron Mael
Songs written by Russell Mael
1984 songs
I.R.S. Records singles
Alternative rock songs
New wave songs
Song recordings produced by Martin Rushent
Music videos directed by Mary Lambert